The Subsistence Homesteads Division (or Division of Subsistence Homesteads, SHD or DSH) of the United States Department of the Interior was a New Deal agency that was intended to relieve industrial workers and struggling farmers from complete dependence on factory or agricultural work. The program was created to provide relatively low-cost homesteads, including a home and small plots of land that would allow people to sustain themselves. Through the program, 34 communities were built. Unlike subsistence farming, subsistence homesteading is based on a family member or members having part-time, paid employment.

Philosophy
The subsistence homesteading program was based on an agrarian, "back-to-the-land" philosophy which meant a partial return to the simpler, farming life of the past. Eleanor and Franklin Roosevelt both endorsed the idea that for poor people, rural life could be healthier than city life. Cooperation, community socialization, and community work were also emphasized. However, going "back-to-the-land" did not always sit well with people stuck in outlying "stranded communities" without jobs.  According to Liz Straw of the Tennessee Historical Commission, the most controversial were those rural communities of long-unemployed miners or timber workers whom opponents of subsistence homesteading thought unlikely to thrive without better job opportunities.

Definition and description
In response to the Great Depression, the Subsistence Homesteads Division was created by the federal government in 1933 with the aim to improve the living conditions of individuals moving away from overcrowded urban centers while also giving them the opportunity to experience small-scale farming and home ownership. Subsistence Homesteads Division Director, Milburn L. Wilson, defined a "subsistence homestead" as follows:

A subsistence homestead denotes a house and out buildings located upon a plot of land on which can be grown a large portion of foodstuffs required by the homestead family. It signifies production for home consumption and not for commercial sale. In that it provides for subsistence alone, it carries with it the corollary that cash income must be drawn from some outside source. The central motive of the subsistence homestead program, therefore, is to demonstrate the economic value of a livelihood which combines part-time wage work and part-time gardening or farming. 

DSH projects "would be initiated at the state level and administered through a nonprofit corporation. Successful applicants were offered a combination of part-time employment opportunities, fertile soil for part-time farming, and locations connected to the services of established cities." The homesteads were organized to combine the benefits of rural and urban living - communities meant to demonstrate a different path towards a healthier and more economically secure future.

History
The Division of Subsistence Homesteads was created by the Secretary of the Interior as an order to fulfill the National Industrial Recovery Act of 1933.  Milburn Lincoln Wilson, then belonging to the USDA's Agricultural Adjustment Administration, was selected by President Frank D. Roosevelt to lead the new Division under Secretary of the Interior, Harold Ickes. Wilson and his advisory committee determined that they wanted the project to prioritize areas hit especially hard by Depression.  Initially, the cost of the houses was not to exceed $2,000 and the homesteads would fall under the administration of the Division and local non-profit corporation created specifically for the community.  The same year, Carl Cleveland Taylor, the 36th President of the American Sociological Society, was appointed sociologist with the SHD. Some of the subsistence homesteading communities included African Americans; Assistant Supervisor John P. Murchison wrote to W. E. B. Du Bois in April 1934 for advice on racial integration and how to incorporate African Americans into the program. Eleanor Roosevelt took personal interest in the project, and became involved in setting up the first community, Arthurdale, WV after a visit to the stranded miners of Scotts Run.

There was strong opposition to the idea of subsistence homesteads, as undercutting agricultural prices, unions, and the labor supply for manufacturing. Nonetheless, as of 2011, some communities, such as Arthurdale, West Virginia, in which Eleanor Roosevelt was personally involved, maintain an active memory of the program.  By March 1934, 30 projects had been started.  Twenty-one were considered garden-home projects, two were full-time farming projects near urban areas, five were for unemployed miners and two were combinations of the aforementioned types. In June 1935, the powers granted to DSH under the National Industrial Recovery Act expired.  On April 30, Executive Order No. 7027 had created the Resettlement Administration ; part of their mandate gave them authority "to administer approved projects involving resettlement of destitute or low-income families from rural and urban areas, including the establishment, maintenance and operation, in such connection, of communities in rural and suburban areas." By another Executive Order (No. 7530), the Subsistence Housing Project was transferred from the Department of Interior to the U.S. Department of Agriculture in 1936.  By the next year, the program had been transferred once again, this time to the Federal Public Housing Authority, where it was formally abolished.  Various architects including Mary Almy, helped design the buildings and homes built under the project.

List of Subsistence Homesteads Division communities 

These communities were planned and built:

Current status
Of the communities listed, five are considered national or local historic districts, including Aberdeen Gardens (VA), Arthurdale (WV), Phoenix Homesteads (AZ), Tupelo Homesteads (MS), Cahaba Homesteads/ Slagheap Village (AL), and Tygart Valley Homesteads (WV).

See also
A Homestead and Hope - the first bulletin for the Division of Subsistence Homesteads, U.S. Department of Interior
Homestead Project Timeline
Urban homesteading
 Smallholding
 Five Acres and Independence
NARA Records of the Farmers Home Administration (FmHA) (Record Group 96) 1918-80 (bulk 1932-59)

References

Communities
 Complete List of New Deal Communities, of the Resettlement Administration, the Division of Subsistence Homesteads, and the Federal Emergency Relief Administration, from the National New Deal Preservation Association

Further reading
"A Place on Earth: A Critical Appraisal of Subsistence Homesteads" by the U.S. Department of Agriculture, Bureau of Agricultural Economics, 1942.
, describes coverage of DSH in various books and journals

External links

New Deal agencies
United States Department of the Interior agencies
Defunct agencies of the United States government
Former United States Federal assistance programs
Urban agriculture
Garden suburbs
Rural community development
Planned communities in the United States
Public housing in the United States
Intentional communities in the United States
1933 establishments in the United States
1935 disestablishments in the United States
Decentralization
 
Government agencies established in 1933
Government agencies disestablished in 1935
Settlement schemes in the United States